Augustus Brevoort Woodward (born Elias Brevoort Woodward; November 1774 – June 12, 1827) was the first Chief Justice of the Michigan Territory. In that position, he played a prominent role in the reconstruction of Detroit following a devastating fire in 1805. He promoted an urban design based on radial avenues, as in Washington, DC and Paris. He is also known as one of the founders of the University of Michigan, established by the legislature in 1817.

Early life
He was born Elias Brevoort Woodward in 1774 in New York, the son of John and Ann Silvester Woodward. His mother was of Flemish ancestry, and his father was of English descent. John Woodward was a merchant and importer, as well as a member of the Continental Army. The family lived in Manhattan on the corner of Pine and Pearl Streets.

Woodward graduated from Columbia College. After working in Philadelphia as a clerk in the U.S. Treasury Department, he later read the law and practiced as an attorney in Washington, DC.

Woodward never married. His biographer, Arthur M. Woodford, describes Woodward as a prototype of Washington Irving's Ichabod Crane. His long, narrow face was dominated by a big nose. He had thick, black hair. His contemporaries commented on his slovenliness.

While living in Washington, D.C., Woodward was described as "a man of middle age, a hardened bachelor who wore nut-brown clothing . . . he slept in his office which was never swept ... and was eccentric and erratic. His friends were few and his practice was so small that he hardly made a living." But while working in Washington, he got to know President Thomas Jefferson, and they shared scientific and education interests.

Michigan Territory

President Thomas Jefferson and Woodward knew each other personally. Jefferson appointed Woodward on March 3, 1805, as the Michigan Territory's first Chief Justice. When Woodward arrived in Detroit on June 30, 1805, he found the city in ruins from the devastating fire earlier that month on June 11. Few buildings were left standing.

Woodward, with Governor William Hull and associate Justices John Griffin and Frederick Bates, possessed all the legislative power in the Territory. Woodward and Griffin, along with the current Governor and a third judge, held this power from 1805 until the institution of a legislature in 1824. Woodward and Hull bickered almost constantly. One of Woodward's legacies is the Woodward Code: a series of statutes serving as the basis of the Territorial Supreme Court legal procedures.

Woodward protected the free status of Michigan Territory in regard to slavery. In 1807 as Territorial Justice, he refused to allow the return of two slaves owned by a man in Windsor, Upper Canada (present-day Ontario). Woodward declared that any man "coming into this Territory is by law of the land a freeman." Detroit became a station on the Underground Railroad, by which fugitive slaves escaped from the South. After Canada had abolished slavery, many went across the river to escape slave catchers who operated even in the northern border areas.

During the War of 1812, Governor (and later Brigadier General) Hull surrendered Detroit to the British without a shot being fired in the Battle of Detroit. While Hull and Justices Bates and Griffin left, Woodward stayed and maintained his judicial status in Detroit during the British occupation. The British offered him the office of Secretary of the Territory, but Woodward declined that offer.

Eventually, he became a problem for the British. He was asked to leave the territory and was granted safe passage to New York. The United States regained control of Detroit in 1813.

Planning of Detroit

Following the destruction of Detroit in the fire of 1805, it fell to Woodward and Hull to oversee the rebuilding of the then territorial capital. The resulting plan drew heavily from Pierre L'Enfant's layout for Washington, D.C. Woodward proposed a system of hexagonal street blocks, with the Grand Circus at its center. Wide avenues, alternatively 200 feet and 120 feet, were designed to radiate from large circular plazas like spokes from the hub of a wheel. Most prominent of these are the construction of the six main "spokes" of Woodward, Michigan, Grand River, Gratiot, and Jefferson avenues and Fort Street. Cornell University professor of city planning John William Reps writes that this original 1807 design for Detroit was "one of the most unusual city plans ever devised.” 

Woodward Avenue in Detroit, originally called Court House Avenue and other names, was popularly named after the justice's work in city planning and rebuilding. Woodward, somewhat in jest, claimed the road's name was simply related to the fact that it traveled toward the wooded area to the north of the city.

The alignment of Woodward Avenue seems to coincide with the axis of the pre-settlement Saginaw Trail which followed a route from Detroit to Saginaw via Flint. It is likely that a series of Indian trails once radiated from the approximate location of the Campus Martius and this may have inspired the choice of a radial geometry for Woodward's city plan.

Though ambitious, Woodward's Plan for Detroit would ultimately be discarded in 1817 while he was away in Washington. Instead of following the pattern laid out by Woodward, then Territorial Governor Lewis Cass platted 10,000-acres of the surrounding countryside into a more typical (for Midwestern America) Grid Plan of 160-acre rectangular farms girded by rectangular roads. This new platting became the basis for the modern layout of Detroit. Despite this remnants of the original plan can still be found within the city's downtown, including the radial avenues emanating from the Campus Martius, the Campus itself, and the Grand Circus.

Later years
Considered a hero upon his return to Washington, DC, Woodward soon concentrated on science (a lifelong interest). He also promoted the founding of the University of Michigan (in 1817) as a state institution. With Rev. John Monteith and Father Gabriel Richard, Woodward drafted a charter for an institution under the name of the Catholepistemiad or the University of Michigania. On August 26, 1817, the Governor and Judges of the Michigan Territory signed the university act into law. The Catholepistmiad originally had the authority to "establish colleges, academies, schools, libraries, museums, atheneums, botanical gardens, laboratories, and other useful literary and scientific institutions consonant to the laws of the United States and of Michigan, and provide for and appoint Directors, Visitors, Curators, Librarians, Instructors and Instructrixes among and throughout the various counties, cities, towns, townships, or other geographical divisions of Michigan." He urged its development along similar themes to the University of Virginia, which was founded two years after the founding of the University of Michigan (in 1819) by Woodward's friend and former president, Thomas Jefferson.

Woodward was described as being among the first to recognize the coming of the scientific age. In 1816, he published his seminal work, A System of Universal Science.

Woodward was also a Freemason.

August 26, 1824, saw Woodward's return to the judiciary, as President James Monroe appointed him to a judgeship in the new Territory of Florida. Woodward served in that capacity until his death in Tallahassee on June 12, 1827, at the age of 52.

Legacy and honors
Woodward is commemorated in a Michigan Legal Milestone erected by the State Bar of Michigan.
Woodward Avenue in Detroit is named after him.

See also

References

External links
A Portrait of Augustus B. Woodward, Michigan Court History
Judge Augustus Woodward
Augustus Woodward, Michigan Supreme Court History Society

1774 births
1827 deaths
American Freemasons
American people of Dutch descent
American people of English descent
Columbia College (New York) alumni
History of Detroit
Michigan culture
Chief Justices of the Michigan Supreme Court
Legal history of Michigan
University of Michigan people
19th-century American judges
Justices of the Michigan Supreme Court